The Bhojpuri Film Awards are an awards ceremony recognizing the best of Bhojpuri cinema. The awards have been presented annually since 2005.

1st Bhojpuri Film Awards
In 2005, the following awards were presented:
 Best Actress: Nagma (Dulha Milal Dildar)
 Best Director: Ranjan Kumar Singh (Firangi Dulhiniya)
 Best Singer Male: Manoj Tiwari (Bandhan Tute Na)
 Best Negative Male: Tinu Verma (Dharti Putra)
 Best Film: Ganga Mile Sagar Se
 Best Actor: Ravi Kishan (Panditji bataai na biyah kab hoyee)
 Best Negative Female: Upasana Singh (Bandhan Tute na)
 Best Supporting Male: Kunal Singh (Panditji bataai na biyah kab hoyee)
 Best Supporting Female: Rinku (Ghar Duar)
 Best Comedian: Ashok Saraf (Mayee ke Bitwa)
 Best Music Director: Nikhil-Vinay (Kab hoyee Gawanawa hamaar)
 Best Singer Female: Deepa Narayan (Ganga Mile Sagar Se)
 Best Story: Ranjan Kumar Singh (Firangi Dulhiniya)
 Best Screenplay: Keshav Rathod (Kab Hoi Gawanawa Hamaar)
 Best Lyricist: Vinay Bihari (Panditji bataai na biyah kab hoyee)
 Best Dialogue: Vinay Bihari (Bandhan Tute Na)
 Best Fightmaster: Tinu Verma (Dharati Putra)
 Best Editor: Asif Khan (Mayee re kar de Bidai Hamaar)
 Best Choreographer: Ram Dewan (Mayee re kar de Bidai Hamaar)
 Best Cinematographer: B. Shauqat (Mayee re kar de Bidai Hamaar)
 Best Art Director: Anjani Tiwari (Ganga Mile Sagar Se)
 Best Publicity Designer: Narsu (Panditji bataai na biyah kab hoyee)
 Lifetime Achievement Award: Kumkumji
 Special Award: Udit Narayan
 Special Award: Rani Chatterjee

2nd Bhojpuri Film Awards
In 2006, the following awards were presented:
 Best Film: Deepak Sawant (Ganga)
 Best Actor: Ravi Kishan (Pandit)
 Best Actress: Nagma (Ganga)
 Best Director: Ashlam Shekh (Dharti Kahe Pookar Ke)
 Best Singer (Male): Udit Narayan (Kanhaiya)
 Best Negative Male: Tinu Verma (Raja Thakur)
 Best Negative Female: Upasana Singh (Uthaile Ghunghta Chand Dekh Le)
 Best Supporting Male: Shatrughan Sinha (Raja Thakur)
 Best Supporting Female: Rati Agnihotri (Kanhaiya)
 Best Comedian: Anand Mohan (Pyar ke Bandhan)
 Best Music Director: Dhananjai Mishra (Pyar Ke Bandhan)
 Best Singer (Female): Pamela Jain (Toha Se Pyar Ba)
 Best Story: Vinay Bihari (Pyar Ke Bandhan)
 Best Screenplay: Manoj Hansraj (Pandit)
 Best Dialogue: Shanti Bhusan (Sathi Sanghati)
 Best Lyricist: Vinay Bihari (Pyar Ke Bandhan)
 Best Editor: Manoj Shakla (Pandit)
 Best Fightmaster: Tinnu Varma (Pandit)
 Best Choreographer: Pappu Khanna (Pyar Ke Bandhan)
 Best Cinematographer: Gyan Sahaye (Bairi Piya)
 Best Art Director: Ananjani Tiwari (Kanhaiya)
 Best Publicity Designer: Narsu (Raja Thakur)
 Best Newcomer (Male): Abhay Kumar (Saiya Sipahiya)
 Best Newcomer (Female): Lata (Hamri Bhi Aavegi Barat)
 Best National Integrate: Abhay Sinha (Pyar ke Bandhan)
 Bhagwati Prasad Gupta Award: Mohanji Prasad
 Lifetime Achievement: Madhuri Mishra

3rd Bhojpuri Film Awards
In 2007, the following awards were presented:
 Best Film: Raaj Israni (Shrimaan Driver Babu)
 Best Director: K. D. (Shrimaan Driver Babu)
 Best Actor: Ravi Kishan (Pandav)
 Best Actress: Urvashi Dolakia (Saas Rani Bahoo Naikrani)
 Best Singer (Male): Dineshlal Nirahu (Kahan Jaeba Raja Najaria Ladae Ke)
 Best Singer (Female): Kalpana Patowary (UP Bihar Mumbai Express)
 Best Negative Male: Abdhesh Mishra (Kahan Jaeba Raja Najaria Ladae Ke)
 Best Negative Female: Roshan Khan (Bhojpuria Bhaiya)
 Best Supporting Male: Kunal Singh (Hamara Se Biyah Karba)
 Best Supporting Female: Konikalal (Mati)
 Best Comedian: Manoj Tiger (Nirahua Rikshawala)
 Best Music Director: Rajesh Gupta (Kab Kahba Tu "I Love You")
 Best Story: Shridhar Shetty (Hamara Se Biyah Karba)
 Best Screenplay: Nabab Arzoo (Sasurari Zindabad)
 Best Dialogue: Amit Jha (Mati)
 Best Lyricist: Vinay Bihari (Kahan Jaeba Raja Najaria Ladae Ke)
 Best Editor: Nabendu Sharma (Tu Hamar Hau)
 Best Fightmaster: Heera Singh (Janam Janam Ke Sath)
 Best Choreographer: Pappu Khanna (Tu Hamar Hau)
 Best Cinematographer: Heera Saroj (Hamar Saiya Hindustani)
 Best Art Director: Vijay Das (Kahan Jaeba Raja Najaria Ladae Ke)
 Best Publicity Designer: Ashok Mehta (Londonwali Se Nehiya Lagawli)
 Best Newcomer (Male): Sudip Pandey (Bhojpuria Bhaiya)
 Best Newcomer (Female): Pratibha Pandey (Hamara Se Biyah Karba)
 Best National Integrate: Rajendra Patel (Londonwali Se Nehiya Lagawli)
 Best Dancer: Sambhawana Seth (Hanuman Bhakt Hawaldar)
 Vishwanath Prasad Sahabadi Award: T-Series
 Lifetime Achievement Award: Sujit Kumar

4th Bhojpuri Film Awards
In 2008, the following awards were presented:
 Best Director: Aslam Shekh (Bidaai)
 Best Film: Chandrashekhar Rao and Istiyan Shekh (Bidaai)
 Best Actor: Ravi Kishan (Dharam-Veer)
 Best Actress: Rinku Ghosh (Bidaai)
 Best Negative Male: Shailendra Shrivastav (Ye Bhauji Ke Sister)
 Best Negative Female: Upasana Singh (Mai Ta Bas Mai Badi)
 Best Newcomer (Male): Ajay Dikshit (Betba Bahubali)
 Best Newcomer (Female): Kalpana Shah (Jogiji Dhire Dhire)
 Best Comedian: Manoj Tiger (Lagal Raha Ye Rajaji)
 Best Supporting Male: Sikandar Kharbanda (Gabbar Singh)
 Best Supporting Female: Geeta Tyagi (Ye Bhauji Ke Sister)
 Best Singer (Male): Kumar Sanu (Vidhata [photaua se])
 Best Singer (Female): Indu Sonali (Ye Balam Pardeshi [Nazar Bhar Dekh Le])
 Best Music Director: Dhananjay Mishra (Hum Bahubali [Prem ke rog])
 Best Lyricist: Siddharth Priyadarshi, Kari humra se tani Pyar) ( Hum Bahubali )
 Best Story: Asalam Shekh (Bidaai)
 Best Screenplay: Ashalam Shekh (Bidaai)
 Best Dialogue: Surendra Mishra (Bidaai)
 Best Fightmaster: Shakil Shekh (Vidhata)
 Best Editor: Jitendra Singh Jitu (Nirahua Chalal Sasural)
 Best Dancer: Seema Singh (Jogiji Dhire Dhire [Ye Sakhi])
 Best Choreographer: Pappu Khanna (Hum Bahubali)
 Best Cinematographer: Karim Khatri (Mai Ta Bas Mai Badi)
 Best Art Director: Anjani Tiwari (Mai Ta Bas Mai Badi)
 Best Publicity Designer: Narsu [Shakti Art] (Hum Bahubali)
 Best National Integrate: R.K. Agrawal and Barkha D. Singh (Ye Bhauji Ke Sister)
 Lifetime Achievement Award: Rakesh Pandey
 Bhagwati Prasad Gupta: Venus Records and Tapes

5th Bhojpuri Film Awards
In 2009, the following awards were presented:
 Best Publicity Designer: Creative Art - Ashok Mehta (Dahakela Jiara Hamar)
 Best Art Director: Samir (Aapan Mati Aapan Desh)
 Best Action Director: Riyaz Sultan (Aapan Mati Aapan Desh)
 Best Cinematographer: Akram Khan (Bhoomiputra)
 Best Editor: Jitu (Diwaana)
 National Integration: Bhoomiputra (A. M. Khan)
 Best Debut (Female): Subhi Sharma (Chhalani Ke Chhalal Dulha)
 Best Debut (Male): Ashish Gupta (Umaria Kaili Tohare Naam)
 Best Supporting Female: Bandani Mishra (Diwaana)
 Best Supporting Male: Sudesh Bedi (Aapan Mati Aaapan Desh)
 Best Item Dance: Seema Singh (Tohar Naikhe Kauno Jod Tu Bejod Badu Ho "Aaglage Mod Es Jawani Men")
 Best Choreographer: Rikki Gupta (Tohar Naikhe Kauno Jod Tu Bejod Badu Ho "Aaglage Mod Es Jawani Men")
 Best Story: S.K. Chauhan (Aapan Mati Aapan Desh)
 Best Screenplay: Aslam Shekh (Pariwaar)
 Best Dialogue: Heri Fernandish (Bhoomiputra)
 Best Lyricist: Vinay Bihari (Umaria Kaili Tohare Naam "Tan Ganga man prem ki")
 Best Singer (Female): Lata Mangeshkar (Umaria Kaili Tohare Naam "Tan Ganga man prem ki")
 Best Singer (Male): Udit Narayan (Umaria Kaili Tohre Naam "Phool ban ke chaman men")
 Best Music: Ram Laxman (Umaria Kaili Tohare Naam "Tan Ganga man prem ki")
 Best Comedian: Mustaq Khan (Bhoomiputra)
 Best Negative Female: Rani Singh (Sajana Sajaida Mang)
 Best Negative Male: Awadhesh Mishra (Odania Kamal Kade)
 Best Film: Pariwaar (Abhay Sinha and Ajay Sinha)
 Best Director: Aslam Shekh (Pariwaar)
 Best Actress: Pakhi Hegde (Pariwaar)
 Best Actor: Ravi Kishan (Bhoomiputra)
 Vishwanath Prasad Shahabadi Lifetime Achievement Award: Jaishree T
 Bhagavati Prasad Gupta Special Award: Durga Prasad
 Jury Mention Award: Pradeep Pandey (Diwaana)

6th Bhojpuri Film Awards
In 2010, the following awards were presented:
 Lifetime Achievement Award: Vijay Khare
 Special Award: Nathu Bhai Gandhi
 Bhagwati Prasad Special Award: P. K. Tiwari (MD Mahuwa Channel)
 Jury Mention Award: Ranbhoomi (Abhay Sinha)
 Vishesh Patrakarita Puraskar: (Prashant Ujwal)
 National Integration: Najariya Tohse Lagi
 Best Actor: Dinesh Lal Yadav (Ranbhoomi)
 Best Actress: Rani Chatterjee (Devra Bada Satavela)
 Best Director: Anil Ajitabh (Ranbhoomi)
 Best Film: Ranbhoomi (Abhay Sinha)
 Best Choreographer: Kanu Mukherjee (Devra Bada Satavela)
 Best Singer (Male): Pawan Singh (Hamra Maati Mein Dum Baa)
 Best Singer (Female): Richa Sharma (Ranbhoomi)
 Best Item Dance: Sambhavna Seth (Ranbhoomi)
 Best Music: Madhukar Anand (Devra Bada Satavela)
 Best Lyricist: Rajkumar Pandey and Shyam Dehati (Devra Bada Satavela)
 Best Supporting Actor: Kunal Singh (Dil)
 Best Supporting Actress: Neelima Singh (Aaj Ke Karan Arjun)
 Best Negative (Male): Abdhesh Mishra (Dil)
 Best Comedian: Manoj Tiger
 Best Debut (Male): Manoj Pandye (Lahariya Luta Ye Raja Ji)
 Best Debut (Female): Bibhuti Triwedi (Najariya Tohse Lagi)
 Best Dialogue: Bhushan Shrivashtava
 Best Screenplay: Anil Ajitabh
 Best Story: M I Raj (Dil)
 Best Cinematographer: Damodar Naidu (Ranbhoomi)
 Best Sound: Ranbhoomi
 Best Editor: Harish Chaudhary (Ranbhoomi)
 Best Action: R. P. Yadav (Aaj Ka Karan Arjun)
 Best Art Director: Abdhesh Shravan (Dil)

See also
 Bhojpuri cinema
 Cinema of Bihar
 List of Bhojpuri films

References

External links
 

Bhojpuri cinema
Cinema of Bihar
Awards established in 2005
Indian film awards
2005 establishments in Bihar